Antonius "Toon" Ebben (22 December 1930 – 4 February 2011) was a Dutch equestrian. After acting as a groom for Max and Ernest van Loon at the 1952 Summer Olympics,  Ebben began competing himself, riding Kairouan in the 1950s–60s and later Jumbo Design (born 1969). At the 1976 Summer Olympics he finished 25th and 12th in the individual and team mixed jumping events, respectively. The following year he won a bronze and a gold European medal in these events. In 1978 Ebeen earned a silver medal in the team jumping, on Jumbo Design, and was named a Knight of the Order of Orange-Nassau.

Ebben retired in 1986. He died in 2011 after a long illness. Since 2012, a jumping competition known as the Anton Ebben Memorial has been held in Amsterdam.

References

1930 births
2011 deaths
Dutch male equestrians
Equestrians at the 1976 Summer Olympics
Olympic equestrians of the Netherlands
Knights of the Order of Orange-Nassau
Sportspeople from Tilburg
20th-century Dutch people